is a Shinto shrine located in the Tado-chō area of the city of Kuwana in Mie Prefecture, Japan. It is well known for its Tado Festival, which takes place on May 4 and 5 every year. The shrine has five nationally designated and one prefecturally designated Important Cultural Properties.

It was formerly a national shrine of the first rank (国幣大社, kokuhei taisha) in the Modern system of ranked Shinto Shrines.

Festivals
 Tado Festival (May 4–5): The largest of the events at the shrine, it involves young men riding horses up a hill and over a wall.
 Chōchin Festival (Saturday and Sunday in late-July): A lantern festival.
 Yabusame Festival (November 23): A horseback riding archery competition.

External links
Tado Shrine homepage 

Shinto shrines in Mie Prefecture
   Beppyo shrines